Florea Dumitrache (22 May 1948 – 26 April 2007) was a Romanian professional footballer who played as a striker. 

Dumitrache spent most of his senior career at Dinamo București, appearing in over 200 league matches and winning three national titles and one national cup. Internationally, he earned 31 caps for the Romania national team and scored 15 goals.

Dumitrache was considered one of the best forwards in Europe during his time, and was well known for his technique and aerial ability.

Club career
Florea Dumitrache was born in Bucharest on 22 May 1948, having been nicknamed since his childhood "Mopsul" (The pug) because of his nose that looked like one of a pug. While playing for TUG București at junior level, he was seen by Dinamo București's coach Traian Ionescu who convinced him to come and play for his team. He made his Divizia A debut on 2 May 1966, playing for Dinamo București in a 1–1 against Dinamo Pitești. He remained with The Red Dogs for 11 seasons, winning three league titles in 1971, 1973 and 1975, in the first he contributed with 15 goals scored in 28 matches, in the second he played 26 games and scored 15 goals and in the third he made 10 appearances and scored 4 goals and one cup in which he scored one goal in the 1968 final which ended with a 3–1 victory against Rapid București. He became the Divizia A top goalscorer twice, first in 1969 with 22 goals and the second in 1971, alongside Constantin Moldoveanu and Gheorghe Tătaru with 15 goals. Dumitrache won twice (1968, 1969) the Romanian Footballer of the Year award, also in 1970 along with Dinamo teammate Cornel Dinu he was nominated for the Ballon d'Or. Italian club Juventus wanted to sign the 24 year-old Dumitrache after his performance at the 1970 World Cup, making an estimated $1.5 million offer for him, but Nicolae Ceauşescu's communist regime refused. After scoring 103 goals in 288 Divizia A appearances for Dinamo, Dumitrache played for Jiul Petroșani and Corvinul Hunedoara obtaining a total of 170 goals scored in 357 Divizia A games. He played a total of 20 games in which he scored 8 goals in European competitions, his last appearance being a 1982–83 UEFA Cup game for Corvinul against FK Sarajevo during which Dumitrache headbutted referee Gianfranco Menegal in the mouth, as a consequence, he was handed the maximum seven year suspension from all UEFA competitions. He ended his career in 1984 after playing for Minerul Știința Vulcan. The Victoria Ground was named "Stadionul Florea Dumitrache" after he died in April 2007 of a digestive hemorrhage.

International career
Dumitrache played 31 games and scored 15 goals for Romania, making his debut under coach Angelo Niculescu in a friendly which ended 0–0 against Netherlands. He played five games in which he scored three goals at the successful 1970 World Cup qualifiers, also making a good performance at the final tournament, being used by coach Angelo Niculescu in all three games from the group stage in which he scored two goals, one against Czechoslovakia and one against Brazil and impressing with his dribbling abilities, especially in front of England's defenders Bobby Moore and Terry Cooper, however Romania did not manage to advance to the next stage. He played three matches and scored two goals at the Euro 1972 qualifiers, also scoring five goals in five games at the 1974 World Cup qualifiers, including two in Romania's biggest ever victory, a 9–0 against Finland. He also played in a 3–1 victory against Greece at the 1973–76 Balkan Cup, making his last appearance for the national team on 23 July 1974 in a friendly which ended with a 4–1 victory against Japan in which he scored two goals.

International goals
Scores and results table. Romania's goal tally first:

Honours
Dinamo București
Divizia A: 1970–71, 1972–73, 1974–75
Cupa României: 1967–68

Corvinul Hunedoara
Divizia B: 1979–80

Individual
Divizia A top scorer: 1968–69, 1970–71
Romanian Footballer of the Year: 1968, 1969
Ballon d'Or 24th place: 1970

References

External links

1948 births
2007 deaths
Footballers from Bucharest
Romanian footballers
Liga I players
Liga II players
CS Corvinul Hunedoara players
FC Dinamo București players
CSM Jiul Petroșani players
1970 FIFA World Cup players
Romania international footballers
Association football forwards
Deaths from gastrointestinal hemorrhage